The Journal of Ethnobiology is a quarterly peer-reviewed academic journal covering ethnobiology. It was established in 1981 as the biannual official journal of the Society of Ethnobiology; publication frequency increased to triannually in 2014 and to quarterly in 2016. The editor-in-chief is Robert Quinlan. According to the Journal Citation Reports, the journal has a 2020 impact factor of 1.391.

References

External links
 

Publications established in 1981
English-language journals
Quarterly journals
Ethnobiology
Anthropology journals